Banham Zoological Gardens is a  zoo in Banham, Norfolk, England. The zoo itself, which today is home to more than 2,000 animals, opened to the public in 1968, became a charity in 2013, and has since been often awarded the prize of Norfolk's Top Attraction, by numerous different organisations, with an annual visitor attendance of in excess of 200,000 people. It is part of the Zoological Society of East Anglia, a registered charity which also owns Africa Alive Zoological Reserve near Lowestoft, Suffolk. 

The mission of the Zoological Society of East Anglia (ZSEA) is to be the flagship for sustainable tourism by connecting people to nature for conservation.

Enjoy a full day out with plenty of activities to thrill and entertain your family, all whilst learning more about some incredible species – from Asian leopards and Russian tigers to more familiar animals found in our own British wildlife. Head to the Farm Barn to get up close and personal to some of the friendly domestic livestock, or step inside the wonderful world of our Tropical House where you’ll find free-flying birds and exotic plants from across South America. Banham Zoo also operates daily animal feeding talks, ‘Amazing Animals!’ presentations and one of the most recognised Birds of the World Displays in the UK. Various fun and interactive sessions are run by Banham Zoo's Education Team in the Conservation Education Centre which opened in 1979.

History
Banham Zoo began as a collection of pheasants and parrots, and opened to the public in 1968. In 1971, it acquired a colony of Woolly Monkeys and became 'Banham Zoo and Woolly Monkey Sanctuary'. Banham Zoological Gardens became the first collection in the UK to breed the silvery woolly monkey. In 1974, Banham Zoological Gardens was accepted as a member of the Federation of British Zoos. Today, it has acquired a much larger collection of animals, but it still retains one of the best collections of smaller monkeys in Europe

Animals

Birds housed at the zoo include emus, Chilean flamingos, sun conures, African penguins, black-necked swans, blue-and-yellow macaws, black kites, red-crested turacos, laughing kookaburras, Von der Decken's hornbills, Temminck's tragopans, snowy owls, spectacled owls, Australian boobook, Rüppell's vultures, Moluccan cockatoos, Swainson's lorikeets, scarlet ibises, African spoonbills, grey crowned cranes and red-legged seriemas.

Primates kept at the zoo include siamang, black-headed spider monkeys, black howler monkeys, black-and-white ruffed lemurs, Goeldi's monkeys, Geoffroy's marmosets, ring-tailed lemurs, golden lion tamarins, golden-headed lion tamarins, blue-eyed black lemurs, western lesser bamboo lemurs, red-bellied lemurs, pygmy marmosets, silvery marmosets, geladas, white-faced sakis, cotton-top tamarins, and emperor tamarins.

Other mammals at the zoo include red kangaroos, giraffes, Sri Lankan leopards, Bactrian camels, black-tailed prairie dogs, Asian small-clawed otters, red pandas, meerkats, Grévy's zebras, sitatunga, maned wolves, Amur tigers, cheetahs, snow leopards, California sea lions, Linnaeus's two-toed sloths, southern pudus, kunekune pigs, Cameroon sheep, alpacas and llamas.

Reptiles and invertebrates at the zoo include Cuvier's dwarf caimans, red-footed tortoises, Amazon Basin emerald tree boas, ball pythons and curlyhair tarantulas.

Exhibits
The Province of the Snow Cat is an exhibit that opened in the year 2009 for the zoo's breeding pair of snow leopards. It features rock-faces and a meandering stream. Three cubs were born here in 2010.

The Giraffe House was built and opened as a celebration of the zoo's 40th anniversary. Since its opening in 2008, there have been several successful giraffe births.

The Bird Garden is a short walk on a meandering path. It features several aviaries with other enclosures opposite. These feature different birds and smaller monkeys respectively. Such species include Von der Decken's hornbills, Swainson's lorikeets, Bali starlings, Geoffroy's marmosets, cotton-top tamarins, and golden-headed lion tamarins.

Lemur Encounters was opened in late 2011 and features two lemur species in a large enclosure. The public can walk around this exhibit and expect to see red ruffed and ring-tailed lemurs making use of their large open space.

Notes

External links

Zoos in England
Zoos established in 1968
Tourist attractions in Norfolk